Imperial Porcelain Factory may refer to: 

Jingdezhen porcelain, Chinese imperial porcelain factories were located there from the 14th century
Vienna porcelain (Kaiserlich privilegierte Porcellain Fabrique), 1718 to 1864
Imperial Porcelain Factory, Saint Petersburg, 1744 to date (under different names 1917 to 2005)
Yıldız Palace, Istanbul, home of the Turkish Imperial Porcelain Factory or "Yıldız Porcelain Factory", 1890s to present